"Recover Your Soul" is a song by English musician Elton John, written by John and Bernie Taupin. It was released in 1998 as the second single of his twenty-fifth studio album The Big Picture.

The song passed a little bit in the shadow of a huge-success single "Something About the Way You Look Tonight" / "Candle in the Wind 1997". John played this song a couple of times in between 1998 and 1999.

Music video
The music video was directed by Marcus Nispel and shot at the Loew's Jersey Theatre in Jersey City with actor/comedian Victor Varnado as the role of the gramophone angel.

Personnel
Elton John – piano, organ and vocals
Davey Johnstone – guitar
John Jorgenson – guitar
Bob Birch – bass
Guy Babylon – keyboards
Charlie Morgan – drums and percussion
Paul Clarvis – tabla
Carol Kenyon – backing vocals
Jackie Rawe – backing vocals

Charts

Weekly charts

Year-end charts

References

1998 singles
Elton John songs
Songs with music by Elton John
Songs with lyrics by Bernie Taupin
Song recordings produced by Chris Thomas (record producer)